Petr Přindiš (born May 2, 1989) is a Czech professional ice hockey defenceman for HC Baník Sokolov of the Chance Liga.

Přindiš previously played 31 games with HC Karlovy Vary of the Czech Extraliga.

References

External links

1989 births
Living people
HC Baník Sokolov players
HC Berounští Medvědi players
Czech ice hockey defencemen
HC Karlovy Vary players
HC Most players
HC ZUBR Přerov players
HC Slavia Praha players
HC Slovan Ústečtí Lvi players
Sportovní Klub Kadaň players
Czech expatriate ice hockey people
Czech expatriate sportspeople in France
Expatriate ice hockey players in France